The 2023 Stanley Cup playoffs is the forthcoming playoff tournament of the National Hockey League (NHL). The playoffs are scheduled to begin on April 17, 2023, a few days after the 2022–23 NHL season, and will end in June 2023 with the 2023 Stanley Cup Finals, to determine the winner of the Stanley Cup.

Playoff teams

This will be the eighth year in which the top three teams in each division make the playoffs, along with two wild cards in each conference (for a total of eight playoff teams from each conference).

As of March 11, the following teams have qualified for the playoffs:

Eastern Conference
 Boston Bruins

Television
In Canada, this will be the ninth postseason under Rogers Media's 12-year contract. Games will air across the Sportsnet networks and CBC Television under the Hockey Night in Canada brand, and streamed on Sportsnet Now and CBCSports.ca (for games televised by CBC).

In the U.S., this marks the second year of a seven-year agreement with ESPN and Turner Sports. In a change from last year, ABC will air First Round Saturday night games (after only airing the 2022 Stanley Cup Finals during the previous postseason). Other First Round games will air across ESPN, ESPN2, TBS, and TNT. Each U.S. team's regional broadcaster will also televise local coverage of First Round games. For the Second Round onward, games will air on either ESPN or TNT. Other ESPN and Turner channels (such as ESPNU, ESPNews, and TruTV) may be used in the event of overflow situations during the first two rounds. ESPN/ABC will have the first choice of which Conference Finals series to air, and TNT will then carry the other Conference Finals series. As per the alternating rotation, the 2023 Stanley Cup Finals will air on TNT. This will mark the first time that the network will carry the Cup Finals, and the first time since 1994 that the entire series will only air in the U.S. on cable television.

References

External links
 Stanley Cup playoffs

Stanley Cup playoffs
playoffs